The Exter Formation is the only formation of the Upper Keuper or Rhätsandstein, and is a geologic formation in Germany. It preserves fossils dating back to the Rhaetian of the Triassic period (specifically around 205 Ma).

Fossil content 
The formation has provided fossils of:

Mammals 
 Thomasia antiqua
 Haramiyidae indet.

Therapsids 
 Chalepotherium plieningeri

Reptiles 

 "Ichthyosaurus" rhaeticus
 Megalosaurus cloacinus
 Nothosaurus cloacinus
 Phytosaurus cubicodon?
 Phytosaurus cylindricodon?
 Plateosaurus ornatus
 Rhaeticosaurus mertensi
 Termatosaurus albertii
 Termatosaurus crocodilinus
 Plateosaurus sp.
 Plesiosauria indet.

Fish 

 Ceratodus cloacinus
 C. heteromorphus
 C. parvus
 C. trapezoides
 Hybodus cloacinus
 H. sublaevis
 Lissodus minimus
 Nemacanthus monilifer
 Sargodon tomicus
 Acrodus sp.
 Asterolepis sp.
 Raja sp.

Insects 
 Triassothemis gartzii

Flora 
 Becklesia franconica

See also 
 List of fossiliferous stratigraphic units in Germany

References

Bibliography 
  
 
 
 
 
 
 

Geologic formations of Germany
Triassic System of Europe
Triassic Germany
Rhaetian Stage
Shale formations
Siltstone formations
Sandstone formations
Deltaic deposits
Lacustrine deposits
Coal formations
Coal in Germany
Paleontology in Germany